Nicholas Lee Stavinoha (born May 3, 1982) is an American former professional baseball outfielder. He played in Major League Baseball (MLB) from 2008 to 2010 for the St. Louis Cardinals.

Early life
He played football and baseball at Jersey Village High School (Graduated in 2000) before attending the University of Houston for football.

He later transferred to San Jacinto College and played there for two seasons as a catcher.  While at San Jacinto, Stavinoha hit 49 Home Runs and is a member of the Golden Anniversary all 50 Greatest JUCO World Series Participants.

Stavinoha went on to attend  Louisiana State University. In 2003, he played collegiate summer baseball with the Wareham Gatemen of the Cape Cod Baseball League.

He is one of the few players in college baseball to participate in both the JUCO World Series in Grand Junction, Colorado (twice) and also at the NCAA D1 World Series in Omaha, Nebraska.

Professional career

Stavinoha was drafted by the Houston Astros in 2002, but did not sign. He was drafted again by the Cardinals in 2005 and signed.

He hit .261 with 13 home runs in 2007 while stealing seven bases, also at Memphis. He hit .297 with 12 home runs at Double A-Springfield in 2006. That batting average ranked fourth among all Cardinal minor league players that played a full season. In 2005, he hit .344 with 14 home runs  in 65 games at Single A-Quad Cities in 2005 as a 23-year-old. He has 55 career minor league home runs. He also has a career average of .304 in the minors.

Stavinoha made his big-league debut on June 22, as a designated hitter, and getting the first hit of his major league career against the Boston Red Sox at Fenway Park. Stavinoha was placed in the Rule 5 draft at the end of the 2010 season. Stavinoha was designated to the Cardinals once again on January 14, 2011. He became a free agent after the 2011 season.

On November 9, 2011, he signed a minor league contract with the Houston Astros. He also received an invitation to spring training. However, he was released on December 14, in order to sign with the Hiroshima Toyo Carp in Japan.

Family
Stavinoha resides in Cypress, Texas with his wife, Casey, and two daughters.

References

External links

Nick Stavinoha at St. Louis Cardinals.Scout.com
St. Louis Today
Nick Stavinoha - player information from Hiroshima Toyo Carp's outfielder roster

1982 births
Living people
Major League Baseball outfielders
Baseball players from Texas
People from Houston
Memphis Redbirds players
St. Louis Cardinals players
San Jacinto Central Ravens baseball players
American expatriate baseball players in Japan
Hiroshima Toyo Carp players
Sugar Land Skeeters players
Wareham Gatemen players
Peoria Saguaros players
Springfield Cardinals players
Swing of the Quad Cities players